Cyberspace and Reds is a mixtape by Mike Skinner under his alias The Streets, released on 24 January 2011.

History
In November 2010, Mike Skinner announced via the official Streets website, that he will release what he referred to as a "mixtape" album called Cyberspace and Reds, consisting of various recordings he had made since he finished work on the final Streets album Computers and Blues. The album cover is the first computer-related photo tweeted to Skinner after his announcement of the album.
The album was initially released only for download via the Streets iPhone app. Users of the app were required to scan one barcode displayed on the website, and the barcode "from the side of a 300g tin of tomato soup by a well known brand" (the brand turned out to be Heinz). Three days after this release, a so-called "deluxe" edition was made available for general download through the Streets website; it featured a reworked version of Robots are taking over, as well as a bonus track called At the back of the line.

Track listing

Release history

References

External links
Download or Listen to Cyberspace & Reds

2011 albums
679 Artists albums
Albums produced by Mike Skinner (musician)
The Streets albums